The National Black Sisters' Conference (NBSC) is an association of Black Catholic religious sisters and nuns based in the United States. It was founded in Pittsburgh in 1968 by Martin de Porres Grey, following her exclusion from the inaugural meeting of the National Black Catholic Clergy Caucus earlier that same year.

Grey led the conference until her departure from religious life in 1974.

Harriet Tubman Award 
Each year at the Black Catholic Joint Conference of Black sisters, priests and brothers, seminarians, and deacons and their wives, the NBSC awards the Harriet Tubman Award to a Black sister who "through her ministry is an advocate for Black people".

Awardees have included:

References

Catholic organizations established in the 20th century
African-American Roman Catholicism
African-American Roman Catholic religious sisters and nuns